Screeb is a small village in south-west Connemara, County Galway, Ireland.  It is located on the R336 regional road, north of Casla and southwest of Oughterard.  It was the location of one of Ireland's few peat-burning power stations. This was uneconomic but a source of employment locally at the time.

Notable buildings
Screeb House, built , was built as a hunting and fishing lodge and later extended. It was built by Thomas Fuge and was a former residence for the Berridge family, the local landlords in the 19th century. Lord and Lady Dudley (founder of the Dudley Nurses) and Sir William Orpen also spent time in this house. Orpen completed some paintings in the area - "Old John's Cottage" was painted in the nearby house of John (Seán) & Mary Geoghegan in Doire Bhainbh in 1908 and he also painted "The Holy Well" with scenes from the Aran Islands and nearby An Teach Dóite (Maam Cross).

See also
 List of towns and villages in Ireland

References

Towns and villages in County Galway